The University of Texas School of Information is a graduate school and undergraduate school at the University of Texas at Austin, offering master's and doctoral degrees in information studies, as well as certificates of advanced study and an undergraduate minor. In 2021, they began offering a bachelor's degree in informatics. UT iSchool graduates find careers in archival enterprise, information architecture, information policy, information systems design and management, information usability, librarianship, multimedia design, museum work, preservation and conservation, and records management.

With more than twenty faculty, a range of joint appointees from across the university, and numerous adjunct faculty selected for their expertise in information studies, the School of Information balances the values of information access as a human and social benefit, with the intellectual and technical skills needed to lead developments in the information age. The Austin program is unique among the information schools for its emphasis on the full lifecycle of information.

History

The school was founded in 1948 as a part of the UT Graduate School as the Graduate School of Library Science, offering a Master of Library Science (MLS) degree as well as certification for school librarianship, an offering which has been continually provided to this day. In 1967 the school initiated a Certificate of Advanced Study followed in 1969-70 by a doctoral program, leading to the degree of Doctor of Philosophy.

The school's name was changed in 1980 to Graduate School of Library and Information Science in recognition of the increased emphasis on information science in the curriculum as it had evolved since the late 1960s. At the same time, the name of the master's degree became Master of Library and Information Science (MLIS). Change has continued into this century with the master's degree name changed again to Master of Science in Information Studies (MSIS) in 2000. In 2002 the faculty voted unanimously to change the school name to School of Information. The new name took effect in 2003 to better reflect the diversity of issues and the multidisciplinary nature of the studies in the information field.

Academic programs

The School of Information offers programs leading to the Master of Science in Information Studies degree, the Doctor of Philosophy degree, Certificates of Advanced Study, and the Learning Resources Certification for School Librarians. The school also offers a minor in information studies for undergraduate students at UT. In 2015, the School of Information launched an executive education program in identity management and security (MSIMS) partnered with the University of Texas Center for Identity. The school does not provide distance education.

Student organizations and groups

All iSchool students are members of SASI: the Student Association of the School of Information.

Archives and Preservation
The Cultural Heritage & Information Preservation Society (CHIPS) (UT Austin Student Chapter) 
Society of American Archivists (SAA) (UT Austin Student Chapter)

Librarianship
 American Library Association (ALA) (UT Austin Student Chapter) 
 Special Libraries Association (SLA) (UT Austin Student Chapter)

Information Technology
 Association for Information Science and Technology (ASIS&T) (UT Austin Student Chapter)
 Advocating for Women in Technology (AWIT)

Rankings

In 2013, U.S. News & World Report ranked School of Information the number six library and information science program in the nation (tied with Rutgers University) and in the top five among public universities.

The school was ranked number two nationally in law librarianship, number four in archives and preservation, number nine in digital librarianship, and number eleven in information systems.

People

Notable alumni
 Laura Bush, former first lady
 Carolyn Harris, library conservationist
 Shelley Sweeney, archivist

Current and former faculty
 David B. Gracy II, former professor
 Loriene Roy, professor
 Roberta I. Shaffer, former dean and professor
 Brooke E. Sheldon, former dean and professor

Publications
Since 1976, the School of Information has housed Information & Culture, an academic journal on the subject of information history.

References

External links
 School of Information

Information schools
Information
1948 establishments in Texas